The 1956 Stanford Indians football team represented Stanford University in the 1956 NCAA University Division football season. The team was led by Chuck Taylor in his sixth year. The team played their home games at Stanford Stadium in Stanford, California.

Schedule

NFL Draft
Three Stanford Indians were selected in the 1957 NFL Draft.

Defensive end Paul Wiggin was selected in the previous year's draft by the Cleveland Browns.

References

Stanford
Stanford Cardinal football seasons
Stanford Indians football